Galhotra is an Indian surname. Notable people with the surname include:

Kumar Galhotra (born 1965), Indian-American entrepreneur 
Om Prakash Galhotra, Indian police officer 
Vibha Galhotra (born 1978), Indian conceptual artist

Surnames of Indian origin
Indian surnames